Kottaram Veetile Apputtan is a 1998 Indian Malayalam-language romantic comedy-drama film directed by Rajasenan, starring Jayaram and Shruti in the lead. The film was dubbed into Tamil as Aranmanaikaran and later remade in Telugu as Manasunna Maaraju and in Tamil as Sound Party.

Plot 
The film tells the story of a rich orphan – Apputtan, a generous and liberal man. He helps settle the financial woes of people in the village. He is attracted to a girl whose education he has been sponsoring. Whilst away she writes him letters in gratitude of the education he is providing her however he misinterprets her gratitude for love. He decides to not tell her of his love, believing that she reciprocates his feelings. Over the 5-year period of her education, he buys her weddings gifts in hope that he can give it to her one day. Once she graduates and returns as a doctor he builds her a medical clinic so she can work in their town. Further misunderstandings and confusion occurs. Apputan's enemy and the girl's father, an alcoholic team up by arranging her marriage with the enemy's son. Eventually, the film ends well with the girl finally coming to know about his love and developing an interest towards Apputtan.

Cast

Soundtrack 
The film's soundtrack contains 6 songs, all composed by Berny-Ignatius. Lyrics were by S. Ramesan Nair, Panthalam Sudhakaran and Chittoor Gopi.

References

External links 
 
 Kottaram Veettile Apputtan at the Malayalam Movie Database

1990s Malayalam-language films
Films scored by Berny–Ignatius
Films shot in Kollam
Malayalam films remade in other languages
Films directed by Rajasenan